Carlo Agostoni (23 March 1909 – 25 June 1972) was an Italian fencer. He won a gold medal, two silvers and a bronze at three Olympic Games.

References

1909 births
1972 deaths
Italian male fencers
Olympic fencers of Italy
Fencers at the 1928 Summer Olympics
Fencers at the 1932 Summer Olympics
Fencers at the 1948 Summer Olympics
Olympic gold medalists for Italy
Olympic silver medalists for Italy
Olympic bronze medalists for Italy
Olympic medalists in fencing
Fencers from Milan
Medalists at the 1928 Summer Olympics
Medalists at the 1932 Summer Olympics
Medalists at the 1948 Summer Olympics